George Herbert Whittaker (22 December 1919 – 26 August 2013) was a Progressive Conservative party member of the House of Commons of Canada. He was an orchardist and farmer by career.

He represented British Columbia's Okanagan Boundary electoral district which he won in the 1972 federal election. He was re-elected in the 1974 and 1979 federal elections, thus serving three successive terms from the 29th to 31st Canadian Parliaments.

Whittaker left national politics in 1980 and did not campaign in that year's national elections. He died in Kelowna in 2013. He was 93.

References

External links
 

1919 births
2013 deaths
Members of the House of Commons of Canada from British Columbia
People from Sturgeon County
Progressive Conservative Party of Canada MPs